The Fugitive is a 2003 Italian crime-drama film written and directed by Andrea Manni. It is based on a 1995 autobiographical novel by Massimo Carlotto, about his period in hiding in France and Mexico following a miscarriage of justice.

For this film Andrea Manni was nominated for David di Donatello for Best New Director.

Cast 
 Daniele Liotti  as Massimo Carlotto
Joaquim de Almeida as  Lolo
 Claudia Coli as  Alessandra
Alessandro Benvenuti as  Lawyer Vignoni
Francesca De Sapio as  Massimo's Mother
Roberto Citran as  Massimo's Father
Marco Giallini as  Beniamino Rossini
 Fiorenza Tessari as  Vignoni's Wife
Gabrielle Lazure as  Vicky
Luisa Ranieri as Maria

References

External links

 The Fugitive on Eurochannel

Italian crime drama films
2003 crime drama films
2003 directorial debut films
Films based on non-fiction books
Italian biographical drama films
Films about miscarriage of justice
2003 biographical drama films
2003 films
2000s Italian films